Notability is the property
of being worthy of notice, having fame, or being considered to be of a high degree of interest, significance, or distinction. It also refers to the capacity to be such. Persons who are notable due to public responsibility, accomplishments, or, even, mere participation in the celebrity industry are said to have a public profile.

The concept arises in the philosophy of aesthetics regarding aesthetic appraisal. There are criticisms of art galleries determining monetary valuation, or valuation so as to determine what or what not to display, being based on notability of the artist, rather than inherent quality of the art work.

Notability arises in decisions on coverage questions in journalism. Marketers and newspapers may try to create notability to create celebrity, fame, or notoriety, or to increase sales, as in the yellow press.

The privileged class are sometimes called notables, when compared to peasants. 

In arguments conferring notability is related to transitivity and the syllogism. If all A's are notable, and x is an A, then x is notable is true by syllogism, but if A is notable, and x is an element of A, then x is not necessarily notable. If x is more notable than y, and y is more notable than z, then x is more notable than z, but if person x considers A to be notable, and A is a subset of B, then x does not necessarily consider B to be notable; an example of an intentional context in the paradox of the name relation.

References

External links 
 "Geography of Fame" (based on "Notability" in Wikipedia) (NYT; 22 March 2014).

Concepts in aesthetics
Celebrity
Journalism
Promotion and marketing communications
Popularity